The Fair of the Dove (Spanish:La verbena de la Paloma) is a 1963 Spanish musical comedy film directed by José Luis Sáenz de Heredia and starring Concha Velasco, Vicente Parra and Miguel Ligero. It is a remake of the film Paloma Fair.

The film's sets were designed by the art director Enrique Alarcón.

Cast

 Concha Velasco as Susana / Mari Loli 
 Vicente Parra as Julián  
 Miguel Ligero as Don Hilarión  
 Ángel Garasa as Tabernero  
 Mercedes Vecino as Señá Rita  
 Milagros Leal as Tía Antonia  
 Irán Eory as Casta / Merche  
 Félix Fernández as Don Sebastián  
 Silvia Solar as Balbina  
 Alfredo Landa as Manolo  
 Mary Begoña as Encarna  
 Antonio Ferrandis as Vendedor de 'la juerga padre'  
 Modesto Blanch as Paco - el cochero 
 Adrián Ortega as Guardia en mercado #1  
 Miguel Ángel Ferriz as Don Lucio  
 Luis Morris as Moro en mercado  
 José Morales 
 Agustín González as Frutero  
 Tony Soler as Vendedora de lotería  
 Erasmo Pascual as Vendedor de claras de limón  
 Xan das Bolas as Francisco, el sereno  
 Ricardo Ojeda 
 Alberto Portillo
 Antonio Moreno 
 Joaquín Pamplona
 Rafael Hernández as Hombre partida  
 Pedro Oliver
 Enrique Navarro 
 Roberto Cruz 
 Valentín Tornos as Vecino anciano  
 Antonio Zaragoza
 Enrique Núñez 
 Manuel Rojas
 Pilar Gómez Ferrer as Señora en báscula  
 José María Tasso as Chulo  
 Joaquín Portillo 'Top' 
 José Blanch as Amigo de Don Hilarión  
 Goyo Lebrero as Guardia en verbena #1  
 Daniel Dicenta 
 María Elena Maroto
 Luis Varela 
 José María Prada 
 Jorge Cuadros
 Narciso Ojeda 
 Simón Ramírez as Narrator 
 Elena María Tejeiro

References

Bibliography 
 Mira, Alberto. Historical Dictionary of Spanish Cinema. Scarecrow Press, 2010.

External links 
 

1963 films
1963 musical comedy films
Spanish musical comedy films
1960s Spanish-language films
Films directed by José Luis Sáenz de Heredia
Films produced by Cesáreo González
Films produced by Benito Perojo
1960s Spanish films